Abey Kuruvilla  (born 4 August 1968) is an Indian former cricketer and general manager of Board of Control for Cricket in India (BCCI). He played as a bowler in mid-1990s for Indian cricket team. He was a selector of BCCI.

Kuruvilla notable for his  1.98 meter height and broad frame. He grew up in Chembur, Mumbai. He retired from all forms of cricket in 2000, and has taken up coaching.

In his brief international career, Kuruvilla played in thirty-five international matches, ten Tests and twenty-five One Day Internationals, all in the same calendar year.

Career
Kuruvilla lead the pace attack on the tour of the West Indies in 1997, when Javagal Srinath was sidelined with a rotator cuff injury. While he returned adequate figures from that tour, and bowled decently in subsequent Test matches on flatter pitches, he was dropped from the team. He announced his retirement from first-class cricket in April 2000 during the quarter-final of the Ranji Trophy, at 31, reasoning that he "had decided [to retire] at the beginning of the season itself that this would be [his] last season. He added, "A lot of young boys are coming up and I have to make room for them, there is no specific reason."

After cricket
On 27 September 2012, Kuruvilla was appointed as the national selector from the BCCI. He was appointed as talent scout for Mumbai Indians.

He was the main reason behind selection of Pravin Tambe in Rajasthan Royals IPL team. On 24 December 2020, Kuruvilla was appointed as the national selector of the Indian Cricket Team. he has been associated with DY Patil group Navi Mumbai since 2009. On 10 February 2022, Kuruvilla quit his selection committee post as he completed his five years tenure with the board.

References

External links

India One Day International cricketers
India Test cricketers
West Zone cricketers
Emirati people of Malayali descent
Living people
1968 births
Mumbai cricketers
Cheshire cricketers
Cricketers from Kerala
Indian cricket coaches
Coaches of the United Arab Emirates national cricket team
People from Alappuzha district